Arno Verschueren (born 8 April 1997) is a Belgian professional footballer who plays as a defensive midfielder for Dutch club Sparta Rotterdam.

Club career
Verschueren made his top flight debut on 9 August 2014 against Waasland-Beveren in a 1–1 draw. He replaced Jarno Molenberghs after 80 minutes.

On 19 January 2022, Verschueren agreed to join Sparta Rotterdam in the Netherlands. The transfer was a loan for the remainder of the 2021–22 season, and then the transfer became permanent, as Verschueren signed a contract with Sparta until the summer of 2025.

Career statistics

References

External links
 
 

1997 births
Living people
Belgian footballers
Association football midfielders
Belgium youth international footballers
K.V.C. Westerlo players
NAC Breda players
Oud-Heverlee Leuven players
Lommel S.K. players
Sparta Rotterdam players
Belgian Pro League players
Challenger Pro League players
Eerste Divisie players
Eredivisie players
Belgian expatriate footballers
Expatriate footballers in the Netherlands
Belgian expatriate sportspeople in the Netherlands
People from Lier, Belgium
Footballers from Antwerp Province